Milan, Biblioteca Trivulziana, Cod. 470 is a 15th-century Book of Hours.  It was made in a French-Burgundian scriptorium.  It measures 131 by 89 mm and has 366 folios.  The text is written in Textualis Gothic bookscript.  There are twenty grisaille miniatures within wide, decorated borders. (See illustration at right).  There are also twenty-two  pages with elaborate initials and borders which match the borders surrounding the miniatures.  There are many other less elaborate decorated initials.  The miniatures are the work of an unknown artist from the circle of Phillippe de Mazerolles. The codex is still bound in its original binding of brown leather with stamped ornamentation.

References 
Bologna, Giulia, Illuminated Manuscripts: The Book before Gutenberg, New York: Crescent Books 1988.

15th-century books
Illuminated books of hours